Banc Bugeilyn is a hill found in Plynlimon between Aberystwyth and Welshpool in the United Kingdom; grid reference SN826925.

The summit is class as a Dewey. The height of the summit from sea level is 551 m (1808 ft).

References 

Mountains and hills of Ceredigion